Nuclear nucleic acid-binding protein C1D is a protein that in humans is encoded by the C1D gene. The C1D protein is encoded by a DNA binding gene traced in the nucleus. Protein C1D has a chromosomal location of 2p14. C1D has a family of proteins consisting of C1D homologues which may include Sas10 domains. C1D is thought to bind to RNA and DNA where it may be involved in mechanisms of DNA repair. Protein C1D is ubiquitously expressed in different human tissues.

Function 

Despite inducing denaturing conditions, C1D shows high-affinity binding to DNA. C1D has demonstrated capability to bind to DNA in DNA repair pathways.

The protein encoded by this gene is a DNA binding and apoptosis-inducing protein and is localized in the nucleus. It is also a Rac3-interacting protein which acts as a corepressor for the thyroid hormone receptor. This protein is thought to regulate TRAX/Translin complex formation. Protein C1D may have a protective effect against relation to the TRAX/Translin complex formation of DNA. Several alternatively spliced transcript variants of this gene have been described, but the full length nature of some of these variants has not been determined.

Interactions 

C1D has been shown to interact with TSNAX and DNA-PKcs. C1D has also shown to interact notably in mammalian cells and yeast. Interaction in mammalian cells only occur ensuing gamma-irradiation.

Protein expression 
The protein C1D is thought to be expressed ubiquitously. It may be expressed in high levels in the mammary gland, thyroid gland, salivary gland, medulla oblongata, and hippocampus. It may be expressed at lower levels in the appendix, heart, lungs, skeletal muscles, and colon.

References

Further reading

External links